Wheat House may refer to:

in the United States (by state)
 Wheat House (Lonoke, Arkansas), listed on the National Register of Historic Places in Lonoke County, Arkansas
 Samuel Wheat House, Newton, Massachusetts, listed on the NRHP in Middlesex County, Massachusetts
 Sabin-Wheat Farm, Putney, Vermont, listed on the NRHP in Windham County, Vermont
 Wheat Row, Washington, D.C., listed on the NRHP in Washington, D.C.